Winklerites is a genus of ground beetles in the family Carabidae. There are more than 20 described species in Winklerites.

Species
These 21 species belong to the genus Winklerites:
 Winklerites andreae Giachino & Vailati, 2011  (Greece)
 Winklerites blazeji Giachino & Vailati, 2012  (North Macedonia)
 Winklerites casalei Giachino & Vailati, 2011  (Greece)
 Winklerites durmitorensis Nonveiller & Pavicevic, 1987  ((former) Yugoslavia and Montenegro)
 Winklerites fodori B.V.Gueorguiev, 2007  (North Macedonia)
 Winklerites gueorguievi Giachino & Vailati, 2012  (North Macedonia)
 Winklerites hercegovinensis (Winkler, 1925)  (Bosnia-Herzegovina)
 Winklerites imathiae Giachino & Vailati, 2011  (Greece)
 Winklerites kuciensis Nonveiller & Pavicevic, 1987  ((former) Yugoslavia and Montenegro)
 Winklerites lagrecai Casale; Giachino & M.Etonti, 1990  (Greece)
 Winklerites luisae Giachino & Vailati, 2011  (Greece)
 Winklerites macedonicus Hristovski, 2014  (North Macedonia)
 Winklerites moraveci Giachino & Vailati, 2012  (North Macedonia)
 Winklerites paganettii (G.Müller, 1911)  (Croatia)
 Winklerites serbicus Curcic et al.  ((former) Yugoslavia and Serbia)
 Winklerites stevanovici Hlavac & Magrini, 2016  ((former) Yugoslavia and Serbia)
 Winklerites thracicus Giachino & Vailati, 2011  (Greece)
 Winklerites vailatii Giachino, 2001  (Greece)
 Winklerites vonickai Giachino & Vailati, 2012  (North Macedonia)
 Winklerites weiratheri (G.Müller, 1935)  (Greece)
 Winklerites zaballosi Giachino & Vailati, 2011  (Greece)

References

Trechinae